Catman (born David Taieb in 1971), son of Willy Lewis, famous French drummer, is a French musician and electronic music producer from Paris. He founded his own label Slackness Records in 2001, co-founded La Maison Magasin in 2008, and the record label end micro-publishing Much Much More based in Brussels, Belgium.

Career 
Familiar with turntables since the age of 14, DJ Shalom a.k.a. Catman has worked with Silmarils, Julien Lourau, Bumcello, Piers Faccini, M, Tryo, Java, Femi Kuti, Tony Allen, and Keziah Jones. He was also part of the group Olympic Gramofon. His first solo album, released in 2003, featured Piers Faccini, Sub-Z, Susie One, Vincent Ségalw and Seb Martel. He has also worked in dance and theater.

Discography

Solo 
 2003 – DJ Shalom (Slackness Records/Bleu Electric)
 2003 – DJ Shalom : Yes professor (Slackness Records/Bleu Electric)
 2008 – DJ Shalom : Freaks  (Slackness Records)
 2008 – Criminal Beats (Volume 1) (Slackness Records)
 2008 – Johnny Dollar : Jack's religion  (Slackness Records)
 2009 – DJ Shalom : Yayas  (Slackness Records)
 2009 – Urban Chill Out (Slackness Records)
 2010 – DJ Shalom : I and I (Slackness Records)
 2015 – Catman : Liberation Song (Much Much More)
 2016 – Catman : Dog Eat Dog (Much Much More)

Duets 
 1998 – Mozesli (Source/EMI)
 1998 – Mozesli : Sunshine (Source/EMI)
 1999 – Mozesli : Love & slackness feat. Juan Rozoff (Source/EMI)
 1999 – Mozesli : Minea feat. Juan Rozoff (Source/EMI)
 1999 – Shalark : Shalamark (Briff)
 2001 – Shalark : Don't (Slackness Records/Karat)
 2001 – Shalark : Some of them don't (Slackness Records/Karat)
 2007 – SH 747 : Brand new times  (Slackness Records)
 2008 – Burning : Burning away  (Slackness Records)
 2009 – Criminal Beats (Volume 2) DJ Shalom & Jeff Boudreaux : The Cesspool Sessions (Slackness Records)
 2010 – Food for children : Art CD n°1

Trio 
 2014 – Struggle (Silène Editions)
 2016 – Electric Pop Art Ensemble : Sent from my place (L'oreille électrique)

Sextet 
 1996 – Olympic Gramofon (Label Bleu)

Remixes et productions 
 1997 – Smoke City : Mr Gorgeous - Mozesli remix (Jive)
 1997 – Sinclair : L’épreuve du temps - Mozesli remix (Source/EMI)
 1998 – Teri Moise : Il sait - Mozesli remix (Source/EMI)
 1998 – Neron - Mozesli remix 
 1998 – Julien Lourau : City boom boom - Dj Shalom remix (Warner Jazz)
 1999 – Ark : De derrière les fagots - 2 original tracks by Shalark (Pias)
 1999 – Ark : Belle lurette - 2 original tracks by Shalark (Pias)
 1999 – Ark : Punkadelik - Shalark remix + 1 original track (Pias)
 2000 – Mr Oizo : Last night Shalark killed Oizo - Shalark remix (F Com)
 2001 – Ark : Le magicien d’os - Shalark remix (Pias)
 2002 – More GDM : Silver Apples - Shalark remix (Tigersushi)
 2004 – Seb Martel : Schizo song – Dj Shalom remix (Delabel)
 2004 – -M- : Quand je vais chez L – Dj Shalom remix (Delabel)
 2008 – Susie One : No shit (Slackness Records)
 2010 – Susie One : No more reality (Slackness Records)
 2012 – Katherina Ex et Fantazio : A sonic meeting (Fantaztic Records)
 2013 – Fantazio : Catman Remix (Fantaztic Records)
 2015 – Zob' : La vie presque belle

Featuring 
 1995 – Silmarils : Silmarils (Warner)
 1995 – Aurèle Ricard :  (Agnès B)
 1996 – Légitime processus
 1996 – Julien Lourau :  (Label Bleu)
 1998 – Julien Lourau :  (Warner Jazz)
 1999 – Emmanuel Bex : Mauve
 1999 – -M- : Je dis aime (Delabel)
 2000 – Java : Hawaï  (Sony)
 2000 – Julien Lourau : Gambit  (Warner Jazz)
 2001 – -M- : Le tour de -M- (Delabel)
 2002 – Charlélie Couture : 109  
 2002 – -M- : Qui de nous deux (Delabel)
 2002 – Femi Kuti : 
 2003 – Minino Garay
 2004 – -M- : Live Au Spectrum  (Delabel)
 2005 – -M- : En tête à tête  (Delabel)
 2006 – Oshen : Je ne suis pas celle  (V2)
 2008 – Keziah Jones : 
 2012 – Tryo :  
 2013 – Fantazio & Jean-François Vrod : Recommandé

Bibliography 
 2015 – K : Hommage à Elsa Cayat (Much Much More)
 2015 – Manifeste Much Much More

Composition for theater and dance 
 2001 : Berenice mis en scène par Frederic Fisbach et Bernardo Montet (Théâtre de la Bastille)
 2006 : Quartett avec Michael Galasso, mis en scène par Bob Wilson (Théâtre de l'Odéon) 
 2009 : Shake that devil ! chorégraphié par  Alban Richard (Forum du Blanc Mesnil)
 2011 : Dans le collimateur de Fantazio (TAP Scène nationale de Poitiers)
 2012 : L'été en apesanteur avec Kitsou Dubois et Fantazio (Théâtre de la Cité Internationale)  
 2013 : Struggle avec Sebastien Martel & Dorothée Munyaneza (Théâtre des Bouffes du Nord)

Ciné-concerts 
 2009 : Auditorium du Louvre (Paris) 
 2009 : Festival Les Nuits Secrètes 
 2009 : Festival Mediarte (Monterrey-Mexique)

Résidences 
 2001 : Shalark - L'Aeronef (Lille)
 2004 : Ateliers imaginaires - La Vapeur (Dijon)
 2004 : DJ Shalom - La Maroquinerie (Paris)
 2005 : DJ Shalom & Susie One - La ferme du buisson
 2005 :  DJ Shalom - La Vapeur (Dijon)
 2005 : DJ Shalom - Jazz à la Villette (Paris)
 2008 : Urban Chill Out - Festival Nuits Secrètes
 2009 : DJ Shalom & Susie One - Festival Factory (Paris)  
 2009 : Minimal Western - Festival Les Nuits Secrètes
 2010 : DJ Shalom vs Black Sifichi - Bibliothèque R. Desnos (Montreuil)  
 2010 : DJ Shalom, Sylvain Kassap & Susie One - Théatre Berthelot / Maison Populaire (Montreuil)

Tour as a sideman 
 1995 : Silmarils (Europe Tour)
 1999 : Julien Lourau Groove Gang : Gambit (National & International Tour)
 1999 / 2000 : Le Tour de -M- (National & International Tour)
 2003 / 2004 : -M- En tête à tête (National & International Tour)
 2013 : Tryo : Ladilafé Tour

Master Class / Workshops 
 Philarmonie de Paris 
 La Cité de la Musique
 Festival Factory
 La Batie Festival de Genève
 AJMI
 CIAM
 CMA
 Festival Nuits Secrètes
 Bougez Rock
 Zicamontreuil
 Ville de Montreuil
 Ville de Bailleul
 La Vapeur

References

External links 
 Official Website
  on Facebook
 Page on Discogs

1971 births
Living people
French electronic musicians
Label Bleu artists